Spider-Man Versus Kraven the Hunter is a 1974 American superhero short film written and directed by Bruce Cardozo. It is a fan film that was endorsed by Marvel Comics and authorized by Stan Lee.

History
According to an article in the 1975 issue of FOOM, the film features appearances by Kraven the Hunter and Gwen Stacy, and the story is based on issue fifteen of the comic book, The Amazing Spider-Man.

In October 1972, Cardozo wrote a letter to Stan Lee explaining the project. He received a very enthusiastic letter of approval providing the film was limited to non-commercial exhibition (because of commercial licensing commitments Marvel Comics had at the time). Next, he presented the idea to his experimental film class, proposing a half hour, 16mm, color, sound, semi-professional Spider-Man movie. When he outlined the special effects the class felt that it was impossible, but his instructor, Peter Glushanok, was very interested and gave Cardozo the go-ahead.

The first term was spent almost entirely in pre-production. Cardozo was a perfectionist, and spoke with hundreds of people before deciding on the cast alone. He wanted the audience to say to themselves, "he or she looks and acts exactly like the characters." Daphne Stevens and Marilyn Hecht made the costumes, Richard Eberhardt designed the graphics, such as the Spider-signal, (as well as playing Spider-Man in costume) and Art Schweitzer created the unusual lighting effects featured throughout the film. Cardozo worked on the scenario, production direction and the special effects.

They built an entire section of building for Spider-Man to climb. They used traveling matte shots to make Spider-Man swing through Times Square at night with all the neon signs flashing in the background to produce breath-taking and dazzling visuals. Rather than using a phony looking backdrop when Spider-Man climbs up and down buildings, they matted in colorful sunsets and backgrounds, and utilized travelling mattes in a scene where Kraven sends lions after Spider-Man in the final conflict.

The second term was hectic with more shooting and editing by Julie Tanser. When the film was bout 3/4 finished, they gave Stan Lee, Ray Thomas and other members of the bullpen, a preview of some of the key scenes of the film. They were very impressed and enthusiastic about the results and encouraged them to finish the project.

Cardozo and his crew had hoped to have the film distributed in some form in the future, but on April 24, 2015, he died. Its last known showing was at the Comic Book and Science Fiction Convention in Los Angeles in 2005. As of 2012 the film was not available online because Cardozo was against it.

Plot
The screenplay was adapted primarily from The Amazing Spider-Man #15, with various scenes added to update the story concerning Kraven's first arrival in America.

Spider-Man swings down and catches a group organizing a bank robbery and upon dropping in unexpectedly, a man escapes and contacts Kraven the Hunter. Parker finds this out firsthand when taking photographs for The Daily Bugle when Kraven arrives by boat. After studying Spider-Man's fighting style by organizing a robbery for Spider-Man to stop, Kraven finally comes out of hiding and fights Spider-Man. Spider-Man realizes the true strength of Kraven and also realizes that Kraven cheats by infecting his opposition with drugs that weaken them.

Cast
 Joe Ellison as Peter Parker / Spider-Man
 A. Andrew Pastorio as J. Jonah Jameson
 Unknown actress as Gwen Stacy
 Unknown actor as Kraven the Hunter

Reception
The casting was very well received by Marvel Comics employees. The realistic suit for Spider-Man was acclaimed and the casting of Andrew Pastario as J Jonah Jameson and Joe Ellison as Peter Parker received praise for their likeness to the characters.

See also
 Spider-Man, a 1969 fan film
 Viva Spider-Man, a 1989 fan film

References

External links
 

American science fiction short films
Spider-Man fan films
1974 films
Short films based on Marvel Comics
1970s English-language films
1970s American films